Roland Louis Ernest Burton AFC and Bar (known as Monty Burton) (18 May 1918 – 28 April 1999) was a British pilot who won the 1953 London to Christchurch air race.

London to Christchurch air race
Flight Lieutenant Burton became the first man to fly from London to New Zealand in under 24 hours, when with his navigator Flight Lieutenant Don Gannon he won the 1953 London to Christchurch air race in a Canberra PR3 in 1953, winning the Britannia Trophy, now in the RAF Museum, Hendon.

Family life
Burton married Joan Evans (1942) and they had two daughters and a son.  One of his daughters Jocelyn Burton became a successful silver and goldsmith. His son Michael Burton (1949–2011) was also a talented silversmith.  Burton retired to France where he died on 29 April 1999.

References

External links 
 British Pathe, 12.000 Mile Air Race 1953
 British Pathe, London Christchurch Air Race 1953, prizes awarded
 Press notes

1918 births
1999 deaths
Royal Air Force squadron leaders
Recipients of the Air Force Cross (United Kingdom)
Britannia Trophy winners